The Sokollu Mehmed Pasha Mosque is a 16th-century Ottoman mosque located in the town of Lüleburgaz in the Kırklareli Province of northwestern Turkey.

The mosque was commissioned by the grand vizier Sokollu Mehmed Pasha (in office 1565–1579) and designed by the imperial architect Mimar Sinan. It was built between 1565 and 1569-70 and forms part of a large complex that includes a medrese (theological school), a hospice and a caravansarai.

See also
List of Friday mosques designed by Mimar Sinan

References

Sources

External links
Sokollu Mehmet Paşa Külliyesi , Archnet

Ottoman mosques in Turkey
16th-century mosques
Religious buildings and structures completed in 1569
1569 establishments in the Ottoman Empire
Lüleburgaz District
Buildings and structures in Kırklareli Province